Baburino is a rural locality (a village) in Kiprevskoye Rural Settlement, Kirzhachsky District, Vladimir Oblast, Russia. The population was 23 as of 2010. There are 11 streets.

Geography 
Baburino is located 12 km northeast of Kirzhach (the district's administrative centre) by road. Yefremovo is the nearest rural locality.

References 

Rural localities in Kirzhachsky District